The siege of Rheinfelden of 1633 or the Spanish recapture of Rheinfelden (Spanish: La Expugnación de Rheinfelden) took place in late October 1633, during the Thirty Years' War.

The Spanish Army of Alsace (20,000 troops) led by the Duke of Feria, Governor of the Duchy of Milan, recaptured the Habsburgian city of Rheinfelden after relieving Konstanz, Breisach and Bregenz. His plan, designed by the favourite and chief minister of Philip IV of Spain, Don Gaspar de Guzmán, Count-Duke of Olivares, was to release the Spanish road along the Rhine of the harassment by Swedish and Protestant-German troops (Heilbronn League), defend the Franche-Comté, safeguard the Tyrol, support the troops of the Holy Roman Empire, and open a strategic corridor for the Spanish troops from the Spanish Lombardy to the Spanish Netherlands.

See also
Spanish Road
Heilbronn League
Catholic League
Duchy of Milan
Franche-Comté
List of Governors of the Duchy of Milan

Notes

External links
Biografía de Don Gómez Suárez de Figueroa, III Duque de Feria 
The Thirty Years War – The Catholic Encyclopedia

References
 Black, Jeremy. European Warfare 1494–1660. Routledge Publishing (2002) 
 Parker, Geoffrey (1984). The Thirty Years' War. London: Routledge and Kegan Paul. 
 

1633 in Europe
Rheinfelden
Rheinfelden
Rheinfelden
Rheinfelden
Conflicts in 1633
Military history of Switzerland